The Friedrichshafen FF.11 was a flying boat built in Germany in the early 1910s.

Specifications (FF.11)

References

Bibliography

Friedrichshafen aircraft
Flying boats